Martínez de la Torre is a city and its surrounding municipality of the same name located in the central part of the Mexican state of Veracruz. The city had a 2005 census population of 56,433, while the municipality had a population of 97,768. There is a total area of 815.13 km² (314.72 sq mi) in the municipality. The largest other community in the municipality is the town of Independencia. 

Martínez de la Torre is on the Nautla River, also known as the Filobobos.

Martinez de la Torre have the most taxi  service that people use for their daily lives.

References
Link to tables of population data from Census of 2005 INEGI: Instituto Nacional de Estadística, Geografía e Informática
 Enciclopedia de los Municipios de México

External links
  
 Municipal Official Information 

Municipalities of Veracruz